Catherine Bellis and Ingrid Neel were the defending champions, but both players chose not to participate.

Ashley Weinhold and Caitlin Whoriskey won the title, defeating Kayla Day and Caroline Dolehide in the final, 7–6(7–1), 6–3.

Seeds

Draw

External Links
 Draw

Dow Tennis Classic - Doubles